"Ocean" is a song by Dutch music producer and DJ Martin Garrix, featuring guest vocals by American singer and songwriter Khalid. Written by Khalid, from Garrix's debut studio album "The Martin Garrix Experience"
Dewain Whitmore Jr., Ilsey Juber and its producers Garrix and Giorgio Tuinfort, it was released by Stmpd Rcrds on 15 June 2018, alongside its music video.

Background
In October 2017, Khalid tweeted Garrix quoting a fan who asked for a collaboration between them, Garrix responded: "Lets do it". Khalid first revealed that he was in the studio with Garrix during an interview on Billboard Music Awards' Facebook Live broadcast on 17 April 2018. Garrix later revealed more details on the song to Kenh14 News, saying: "At the moment, I can announce that I have a new song with Khalid. He is a great singer. We will release it early June. I'm really excited about it." In an interview with Sirius XM Hits 1 at the 2018 Billboard Music Awards, Garrix announced the song's title and release date. The official announcement came on 11 June, along with the single artwork.

Music video
A music video for the song was released via Garrix's YouTube channel on 15 June 2018.

The video was shot in a warehouse in Hamilton, Ontario, which had no water or electricity. The production crew constructed stage lighting, LEDs and a building with glass and mirrors to go with the mood of the song. As of August 2022, the video has received over 293 million views.

Critical reception
Kat Bein of Billboard felt that the track was "perfectly suited for Khalid's soulful range", who gave listeners his "alto richness and falsetto tenderness over the slow burn beat Garrix cooked". Matthew Meadow from Your EDM described "Ocean" as "the most mellow of any Garrix song we've heard thus far" which "plays more to Khalid's style than it does to his own", thus missing out on most of Garrix's signature musical style. Dancing Astronaut's Chris Stack wrote that the pair delivered a "laid back pop track blending electronic tropes with elements of rock and R&B into a soothing soundscape polished by calming harmonies", while noting the successful continuation of Khalid's "foray into EDM".

Personnel
Credits adapted from Tidal.
 Martin Garrix – production, mix engineering
 Khalid – vocals
 Giorgio Tuinfort – production
 Denis Kosiak – engineering, vocal production

Charts

Weekly charts

Year-end charts

Certifications

References

2018 singles
2018 songs
Khalid (singer) songs
Martin Garrix songs
Pop ballads
Songs written by Giorgio Tuinfort
Songs written by Ilsey Juber
Songs written by Khalid (singer)
Songs written by Martin Garrix
Stmpd Rcrds singles
Songs written by Dewain Whitmore Jr.